André Bourreau (born 3 December 1934) is a French judoka. He competed in the men's lightweight event at the 1964 Summer Olympics.

References

1934 births
Living people
French male judoka
Olympic judoka of France
Judoka at the 1964 Summer Olympics
Place of birth missing (living people)